Glasgow City Sevens is an annual rugby sevens tournament held by Cartha Queens Park, in Dumbreck in the south side of Glasgow. The tournament was previously known as the Cartha Sevens and the Cartha Queens Park Sevens.

History

The first rugby sevens tournament started by Cartha RFC took place in April 1935 and continued for the following two years. After a break around the Second World War period the Sevens were reintroduced in 1950 and in has been played in all the subsequent years.

The tournament became known as the Cartha Queens Park Sevens on the merger of Cartha and Queens Park F.P. in 1974. The tournament has been called the Glasgow City Sevens since 2005.

Legacy Sevens competition

Held around the start of every May, the tournament is part of the Legacy Sevens competition. The competition was developed to help the sport ahead of the Glasgow 2014 Commonwealth Games. It was launched in 2011.

The Legacy Sevens includes Sevens tournaments around Scotland's Central Belt.

Around 6 tournaments per year take part in each annual Legacy Sevens competition. The Legacy Sevens competition ends with the final Glasgow City Sevens showcase event. The Sevens tournaments involved are:-

 Stirling Sevens
 Boroughmuir Sevens
 Howe of Fife Sevens
 Hamilton Sevens
 Greenock Sevens
 Kirkcaldy Sevens
 Perthshire Sevens
 Glasgow City Sevens

Ranking points

The Legacy Sevens series is won by collecting ranking points. These points are gained by how well the teams progress in the Sevens tournaments represented.

Points are awarded as follows:

 Cup Winners – 15
 Cup Finalists – 10
 Cup Semi Finalists – 7
 Cup Quarter Finalists – 5
 Plate Winners – 5
 Plate Finalists – 2

Double points are awarded for the showcase Glasgow City Sevens tournament.

Sponsorship

The Legacy Sevens series is sponsored by Arnold Clark.

Glasgow City Sevens Cup

The winners receive the Glasgow City Sevens Cup. There is also a Plate competition.

Invited Sides

Various sides have been invited to play in the Glasgow City Sevens tournament throughout the years. Ospreys, Ulster and Wasps were invited in 2011. Tynedale and the Royal Scots were invited in 2016. London Scottish were invited in 2017. Saracens and Munster Rugby were invited in 2013. Newcastle Falcons and Dragons were invited in 2009. CUS Torino and Sale Sharks were invited in 2006 alongside Glasgow Warriors, Edinburgh and the Border Reivers. Ulster won the event in 2014.

International 7s sides

The Sweden 7s side took part in 2010.

Sponsorship

NCS are longstanding sponsors of the tournament.

Past winners

See also
 Cartha Queens Park
 Scottish Rugby Union

References 

Rugby sevens competitions in Scotland
Rugby union in Glasgow